The 17th National Film Awards were presented by the Ministry of Information and Broadcasting of India to facilitate the best of Indian cinema released in 1969. The ceremony took place at University Centenary Auditorium, Madras on 21 November 1970.

At the 17th National Film Awards, a new award was introduced to honour the father of Indian cinema, Dhundiraj Govind Phalke, better known as Dadasaheb Phalke. Named the Dadasaheb Phalke Award, it was introduced to recognise the contribution of film personalities towards the development of Indian cinema. Starting with the 100th anniversary of the birth of Phalke in 1870, the award was awarded annually for this distinguished contribution.

Juries 

Six different committees were formed based on the filmmaking sectors in India; along with the award categories, they were mainly based in Bombay, Calcutta and Madras. Another committee for the All India level was also formed, which included some of the members from the regional committees. For the 17th National Film Awards, this central committee was headed by Justice G. D. Khosla.

 Jury Members: Central
 G. D. Khosla (Chairperson)Sitaram KesriShiela VatsA. C. JalanEzra MirB. K. KaranjiaTeji BachchanI. S. JoharHaridas BhattacharjeeU. Visweswar RaoSunder Lal NahataM. N. Kapur
 Jury Members: Documentary
 Tara Ali Baig (Chairperson)Rashid-Ul-TalibKapila VatsyayanUsha BhagatShanta Gandhi
 Jury Members: Short Films
 Amrita Pritam (Chairperson)R. G. AnandInder Lal Das
 Jury Regional: Bombay
 Nissim Ezekiel (Chairperson)Urmila KapurNavin KhandwallaR. S. PandeFiroze RangoonwallaBikram SinghBal ChhabdaShatrujit PaulBuny TalwarG. P. Shirke
 Jury Regional: Calcutta
 Amala Shankar (Chairperson)Roma ChoudhryChintamoni KarK. C. PanigrahiA. K. PramanickUtpal DuttaKanan DeviKartic ChatterjeeDurgadas MitraArti Tagore
 Jury Regional: Madras
 C. R. Pattabhiraman (Chairperson)P. Achutha MenonR. K. NarayanMallikarjuna RaoSarojini VaradappanK. ManoharanRajammal AnantharamanV. C. SubburamanD. V. S. RajuB. Ananthaswami

Awards 

Awards were divided into feature films and non-feature films.

The President's Gold Medal for the All India Best Feature Film is now better known as the National Film Award for Best Feature Film, whereas the President's Gold Medal for the Best Documentary Film is analogous to today's National Film Award for Best Non-Feature Film. For children's films, the Prime Minister's Gold Medal is now given as the National Film Award for Best Children's Film. At the regional level, the President's Silver Medal for Best Feature Film is now given as the National Film Award for Best Feature Film in a particular language. Certificates of Merit in all categories have been discontinued over the years.

Lifetime Achievement Award

Feature films 

Feature films were awarded at the All India as well as the regional level. For the 17th National Film Awards, a Bengali film Bhuvan Shome won the President's Gold Medal for the All India Best Feature Film while also winning the maximum number of awards (three).

All India awards 

The awards given at the All India level were as follows:

Regional awards 

Some awards were given to the best films made in the various regional languages of India. For feature films in English, the President's Silver Medal for Best Feature Film was not given. The producer and director of the winning films were awarded with 5,000 and a Silver medal, respectively.

Non-Feature films 

Awards were also given to numerous short films.

Awards not given 

Some awards were not given because no film was considered suitable:

 Best Story Writer
 Best Film on Family Welfare
 Best Children's Film
 Best Child Artist
 Best Film on Social Documentation
 Best Experimental Film
 Best Promotional Film (Non-Commercial)
 President's Silver Medal for Best Feature Film in English

References

External links 
 National Film Awards Archives
 Official Page for Directorate of Film Festivals, India

National Film Awards (India) ceremonies
1970 film awards
1970 in Indian cinema